Sir George Grey, 1st Baronet,  (10 October 1767 – 3 October 1828) was a British Royal Navy officer and a scion of the noble House of Grey who served as Master and Commander of the Mediterranean Fleet. He joined the Royal Navy at the age of 14 and was on active service from 1781 to 1804, serving in the American War of Independence, the French Revolutionary War and the Napoleonic War. He served as Flag Captain for John Jervis, Earl of St Vincent and later as Flag Captain for King George III on his royal yacht. From 1804 to 1806, he was Commissioner at Sheerness Dockyard, and from 1806 until his death in 1828 he was Commissioner at Portsmouth Dockyard.<ref name="creighton3to4">{{cite book |last=Creighton |first=Mandell |title=Memoir of Sir George Grey Bart., G.C.B. |publisher=Longmans, Green, and Co. |year=1901 |pages=3–4}} — The book is a memoir of Sir George Grey, 2nd Baronet but the first chapter outlines the early lives of Sir George Grey, 1st Baronet; his parents and brothers; his wife, Mary Whitbread and her parents and their careers.</ref>

Early life
Grey was born at the family estate of Fallodon Hall, Northumberland on 10 October 1767, the third son of Lieutenant General Charles Grey, 1st Earl Grey and the Countess Elizabeth Grey. Among his siblings were Charles Grey, 2nd Earl Grey, who became Prime Minister of the United Kingdom and abolished slavery in 1833, Lieutenant General Sir Henry George Grey, Governor of Cape Colony, and Edward Grey, Bishop of Hereford.

 Naval career 
Grey joined the Royal Navy at the age of 14, serving in the West Indies and home waters from 1781.  He was on  under Captain Lord Robert Manners in Rodney's action of the Battle of the Saintes against the French on 12 April 1782National Archives Caird Library ADM 354/222/175 Letter from Commissioner Grey 13 April 1806, stating to the Navy Board that he had also served in Rodney's action of 12 April 1782 on the Resolution His commission for service at the rank of 4th Lieutenant was issued in 1784.

Following representations made by Charles Grey, to John Pitt, 2nd Earl of Chatham detailing the career of his son George, also a lieutenant in the navy, and requesting consideration for promotion, he was on 7 August 1793 confirmed as Captain of HMS Vesuvius (1776). At the commencement of the war with France in 1793, Grey was serving on the 32-gun HMS Quebec, from which he was promoted to the command of the Vesuvius bomb vessel and on 3 October 1793, Sir John Jervis hoisted the flag of a Vice-Admiral of the Blue on HMS Boyne. His flag captain was the son of the general commanding the troops, Captain George Grey, from thenceforth associated with his patron's services, and with his affection to the latest hour of his life.  The combined forces, commanded jointly by John Jervis and Grey's father, General Charles Grey, proceeded to the Caribbean where they captured the French colonies of Martinique, Guadeloupe and St Lucia. According to accounts of the time, Charles Grey ordered 2,400 troops to attack the French-held forts.  His son, Captain George Grey and Captain Nugent were often employed, with 200 or 400 seamen, to move the heavy guns, ammunition and supplies to the troops, and at times to storm the enemy at the point of bayonet to gain territory.

On their return to British waters on 1 May 1795, HMS Boyne caught fire during Marine exercises while anchored off Spithead.  The fire spread quickly, causing the on-board cannons to fire at nearby ships attempting to rescue the seamen on board.  Eleven crewmen from the Boyne lost their lives, and two from the Queen Charlotte, anchored nearby.  The anchor cables were destroyed by the fire, so the ship drifted and eventually ran aground.  It eventually had to be blown up, and the Boyne Buoy, still marks the position of the wreck near Southsea Castle at the entrance to Portsmouth Harbour.  The accident happened before John Jervis had been able to remove all his papers and belongings, so everything he had on board was lost. George Grey, as captain, was court-martialed but acquitted, as he had not been on board at the time.

 In November 1796, Captain Grey sailed with John Jervis and Robert Calder on HMS Lively, to join the Mediterranean Fleet at Gibraltar. During the Battle of Cape St Vincent of 14 February 1797, despite the heavy fighting, there was only one fatality on HMS Victory, when a Marine was shot alongside John Jervis on the poop deck.Tucker. Jedediah Stephens Memoirs of Admiral the Right Hon the Earl of St. Vincent Vol. I Richard Bentley 1844, p. 259.

By June 1799, Earl St Vincent had given Captain Grey the dormant position of Adjutant-General of Fleet and requested that he be permitted to have Grey accompany him home on the Ville de Paris. The service record of George Grey as Adjutant General of the Fleet whilst on Argo and Guerrier from June to November 1799 by Evan Nepean 26 Dec 1801

In April 1800, John Jervis was recalled to command the Channel Fleet, to quell the mutinous spirit of the crews. Lord St Vincent was desirous of calling to his assistance in the Channel, as many as he could of the Officers formed in the Mediterranean Fleet... That the Admiralty could not, at a moment's notice, comply with these wishes as fully as his Lordship imparted them, may also be as easily supposed.  Captain Grey accompanied the Admiral as his Flag Captain on HMS Ville de Paris.Tucker. Jedediah Stephens Memoirs of Admiral the Right Hon the Earl of St. Vincent Vol. II Richard Bentley 1844, p. 5-7.
At the beginning of the short peace in March 1801, he accepted the command of one of the royal yachts at Weymouth, and did not again see active service. The Grey family lived at Weymouth for the three years of his service to King George III and a doll's house that was presented to his daughters by the Royal princesses is on display at Kew Palace.

 Admiralty Commissioner 
From 1804 to 1806, Captain Grey was Commissioner of Sheerness Dockyard. There his body lay in state until 8 January 1806 before being moved by state barge to Whitehall and the Admiralty for a state funeral.

In 1806, George Grey was appointed Commissioner at Portsmouth Dockyard. Besides overseeing the changing face of the Navy and the Dockyard being instigated by the Lord of the Admiralty, Earl St Vincent, Sir George had an important administrative role to play.  Some of his correspondence with the Navy Board from 1807 to 1827 is still kept by National Archives relating to the workers, maintenance and general operation of the dockyard, including major accidents. He also wrote to the Board on behalf of offenders who faced deportation or death for their crimes.

In 1807, the mayor of Portsmouth John Carter, together with the aldermen, Town Clerk and Coroner, arrived at the Dockyard gates to assert the right of judicial process over the whole dockyard.  George Grey refused them entry until he had assurances that they were not claiming jurisdiction over the soil of the dockyard.

He became President of the Portsmouth Dock Yard Bible Association in 1817 and was an active supporter, with his wife, of Missions to Seafarers. His wife, Mary Whitbread, took an active role in looking after the dockyard workers' families, sick seamen and seafarer's orphans.  She was the first woman to have been recorded as actively supporting seamen's missions by supplying scriptures and other religious reading materials to officers and instructing them to read to the men or distribute material to crews at sea. She did this for over 20 years.

In 1814 during a royal visit instigated by the Prince Regent (later King George IV), Emperor Alexander I of Russia, Catherine, Grand Duchess of Oldenburg, the Earl of Yarmouth, and Russian Ambassado Count Lieven stayed at the Commissioner's residence in Portsmouth Dockyard.Allen. Lake. History of Portsmouth 1817 On 29 July he was created a Knight Commander of the Bath.

Sir George maintained his close friendship with Admiral John Jervis until his death in 1823.

In addition to his work as Commissioner of the Dockyard he was also Marshal of the Vice-Admiralty Court at Barbados; an Alderman of Portsmouth and Vice President of the Naval and Military Bible Society.

Death and funeral
Sir George Grey died at the Commissioner's residence, Portsmouth Dockyard, on 3 October 1828. The Hampshire Telegraph'' reported his funeral on 13 October 1828:

"The remains of the Hon. Sir Geo. Grey, Bart. were this morning deposited in the Chapel of this Garrison, the Burial Service being performed by Rev. W.S. Dusauloy... The pall was borne by Admiral the Hon. Sir Robert Stopford, Vice-Admiral Sir Harry Burrard-Neale, 2nd Baronet, Rear-Admiral Gifford, Major-General Sir Colin Campbell and Captains Loring and Chetham. the principal Officers in his Majesty's Dockyard in mourning coaches, and several hundred of the shipwrights and other artificers of the yard, on foot, followed. On the Grand Parade, a passage to prevent interruption, was formed by the military and the whole was conducted in the most solemn and impressive manner..."

He was buried at the Royal Garrison Church, Portsmouth, where a memorial plaque is displayed in the chancel.

Baronetcy 
Sir George Grey was created 1st Baronet Grey of Fallodon on 29 July 1814, following the visit of the Allied Sovereigns to Portsmouth, and was appointed a Knight Commander of the Order of the Bath (KCB), by King George IV, following a further Royal visit to the Portsmouth Dockyard.

Family 

On 18 Jun 1795, George Grey married Mary Whitbread (1770–9 May 1858) of Bedwell Park in Hertfordshire, daughter of brewer Samuel Whitbread (1720–1796) and Lady Mary Cornwallis (1736–1770), and sister of Charles Cornwallis, 1st Marquess Cornwallis.  Mary's brother, Samuel Whitbread (1764–1815), an English politician, was married to Elizabeth Grey, eldest daughter of Charles Grey, 1st Earl Grey and George Grey's sister.

George Grey and Mary Whitbread had the following children:
 Mary Grey (1796–1863) who first married Royal Navy Captain Thomas Monck Mason in 1823, with whom she had seven children, including Mary Grey, grandmother of Jessie Mary Grey, Lady Street. She remarried Henry Gray in 1840 in Ireland. 
 Rt. Hon. Sir George Grey, 2nd Baronet, MP (1799–1882) born in Gibraltar and sometimes Home Secretary between the years of 1846 and 1866. He married Anna Sophia Ryder and had one son, Lt. Col. George Henry Grey (1835–1874).
 Elizabeth Grey (1800–1818) who married Charles Noel, 1st Earl of Gainsborough and died after the birth of their son, Charles George Noel, 2nd Earl of Gainsborough.
 Harriet Caroline Augusta Grey (1802–1889) who married Reverend John Simon Jenkinson and had six children.
 Hannah Jean Grey (1803–1829) married Sir Henry Thompson, 3rd Baronet of Virkees (1796–1838), and died shortly after the birth of their daughter Hannah Jane Thompson.
 Jane Baring, Baroness Northbrook (1804–1838) married Francis Baring, 1st Baron Northbrook (grandson of Sir Francis Baring, 1st Baronet, founder of Barings Bank) and had five children.
 Charlotte Grey (1805–1814).
 Charles Samuel Grey (1811–1860) married firstly Laura Mary Elton (died 1848), daughter of Sir Charles A. Elton 6th Bt, with whom he had five children and secondly Margaret Dysart Hunter, daughter of Gen. Sir Martin Hunter, in 1850 with whom he had a further five children. He held the post of Paymaster of the Civil Services in Ireland.
 A son who died in infancy 1814.

Descendants of Sir George include: Edward Grey, 1st Viscount Grey of Fallodon Thomas Baring, 1st Earl of Northbrook Francis Baring, 2nd Earl of Northbrook, the 2nd, 3rd, 4th, 5th and 6th Earls of Gainsborough, Sir Peter Curtis, 6th Baronet, Admiral Francis George Kirby, Lt. Col. Norborne Kirby, and Commander Sir Laurence Street and Commander Alexander Street.

References

Bibliography

External links 
 The Peeerage.com: Captain Hon. Sir George Grey, 1st Baronet
 Memoirs: Chapter 1 Parentage and Early Years
 Private Papers of George 2nd Earl Spencer, First Lord of the Admiralty 1794–1801. Spencer to St Vincent 29 August 1798 – stating Capt George Grey to be Master & Commander of Mediterranean Fleet
 Kew Dolls' House
 Commissioners of H.M. Dockyards. Portsmouth 22 July 1806 Hon. George Grey (1) Capt, R.N. (Bart, 1814, K.C.B. 1820).  Sheerness 24 Apr 1804 Hon George Grey (1)
 Page 164: Major Operations 1803–1815, Return of Nelson's body to London
 Biography of Sir George Grey in Portsmouth
 Royal visit to Portsmouth Dockyard
 The National Maritime Museum
 Reference GB 0064 GRE: Papers of Sir George Grey

 HMS Victory
 The National Archives: Nelson gallery
 Memoirs, pp 148 and 149 – departure for Gibraltar from Portsmouth
 Memoirs, pp  259 – death of marine on Victory, Battle of Cape St Vincent
 Memoirs, pp  393 and 394 – death of Admiral Jervis 1823
 Gentleman's Magazine Vol 98, Part 2, Pages 371–2 - 1828 Obituary of Hon Sir G. Grey

|-

1767 births
1828 deaths
Royal Navy officers
Knights Commander of the Order of the Bath
Baronets in the Baronetage of the United Kingdom
People from Howick, Northumberland
Military personnel from Northumberland
Younger sons of earls